James Washington Logue (February 22, 1863 – August 27, 1925) was an American lawyer and Democratic member of the United States House of Representatives from Pennsylvania.

Biography
J. Washington Logue was born in Philadelphia, Pennsylvania.  He graduated from La Salle University  in Philadelphia.  He studied law, was admitted to the bar in 1888 and commenced the practice of his profession in Philadelphia.

Logue was elected as a Democrat to the Sixty-third Congress.  He was an unsuccessful candidate for reelection in 1914.  He was an unsuccessful candidate for Lieutenant Governor of Pennsylvania in 1918.  He resumed the practice of law in Philadelphia, and was a member of the speakers’ bureau of the Council of National Defense during World War I.  He served as secretary of the board of inspectors of the Eastern Penitentiary in 1923.

He died in Philadelphia on August 27, 1925, and was interred at Holy Sepulchre Cemetery in Cheltenham Township, Pennsylvania.

References

The Political Graveyard

External links

1863 births
1925 deaths
Burials at Holy Sepulchre Cemetery
Democratic Party members of the United States House of Representatives from Pennsylvania
Lawyers from Philadelphia
Politicians from Philadelphia
La Salle University alumni